Bert Davis was a footballer.

Bert or Bertie Davis may also refer to:

Bert Davis (businessman), candidate in California lieutenant gubernatorial election, 2010
Bert Davis, character in Gold Rush Maisie
Bert Davis, in 1943 NFL Draft
Bertie Davis, character in Riptide (film)
Bertie Davis (footballer), English footballer
A. R. Davis British and Australian Asian Studies academic

See also
Albert Davis (disambiguation)
Robert Davis (disambiguation)
Bertram Davis, murderer
Herbert Davis (disambiguation)
Hubert Davis (disambiguation)